Magic Time is the thirty-first studio album by Van Morrison, released in 2005 by Geffen Records.  The album debuted at number 25 on the US Billboard charts and number 3 on the UK charts—Morrison's best chart debut until Still on Top – The Greatest Hits debuted at number 2 on the UK charts in 2007. By the end of 2005, Magic Time  had sold 252,000 copies in the United States, according to Nielsen SoundScan. Rolling Stone listed it as #17 on their list of The Top 50 Records of 2005.

Recording 
The album covers a variety of styles ranging from Celtic rock to R&B and the blues. "Just Like Greta" was recorded in 2000 and originally intended for 2002's Down the Road (when the album was tentatively titled Choppin' Wood), but it was ultimately dropped and used for this album. The rest of the songs were recorded in 2003.

Composition 
The title song is about a nostalgic searching of the past in order to capture a magic moment almost lost in memory.  "The Lion This Time" is a continuation over thirty years later of "Listen to the Lion" that first appeared on his album  Saint Dominic's Preview. There is a nursery rhyme quality to it as with its predecessor and a delicate use of a classical string arrangement.  Thom Jurek with Allmusic says:  "The acoustic 'The Lion This Time' is one of the finest ballads Morrison has cut in decades. Period."  "Gypsy in My Soul" is also reminiscent of a song "Gypsy"  from Saint Dominic's Preview.  "Just Like Greta" and "Stranded" have similar themes of being lost in an alien world with only oneself to rely on.  "Celtic New Year" is reminiscent of Irish Heartbeat, an album with The Chieftains. An Allmusic review calls it "trademark Morrison; the long, loping, repetitive line that is his trademark fuels this one.  It's carried by the interplay between Morrison's acoustic and Foggy Lyttle's electric guitar fills, and aided by Chieftain Paddy Moloney's whistle." "Carry On Regardless" is a singing list of "Carry On Films" that Morrison seemed to have a special fondness for.

Reception 

A Paste reviewer on Magic Time says: "You expect to encounter a tired legend, a once-mighty king becalmed and tamed by the miles and years. You find instead an echo of a full-throated roar hanging in the air, the telltale signs of a bloody struggle, and an empty cage. The lion in winter is on the loose." (Andy Whitman)

The Music Box rated Magic Time the number seven album of the year in May 2005.

Liner notes 
On the first page of the liner notes is the notation:
"This album is dedicated to the memory of Foggy Lyttle who played on most of the tracks."

Track listing 
All songs by Van Morrison; unless otherwise noted

 "Stranded" – 5:34
 "Celtic New Year" – 6:10
 "Keep Mediocrity at Bay" – 3:44
 "Evening Train" – 2:48
 "This Love of Mine" (Sol Parker, Henry W. Sanicola, Frank Sinatra) – 2:42
 "I'm Confessin'" (Doc Daughtery, Al Neiburg, Ellis Reynolds) – 4:29
 "Just Like Greta" – 6:25
 "Gypsy in My Soul" – 4:04
 "Lonely and Blue" ("Black and Blue" with altered lyrics) (Harry Brooks, Andy Razaf, Fats Waller) – 3:41
 "The Lion This Time" – 4:56
 "Magic Time" – 5:06
 "They Sold Me Out" – 3:11
 "Carry On Regardless" – 5:54

Personnel 
Musicians:
 Van Morrison – vocals, electric guitar, acoustic guitar, harmonica, alto saxophone
 Mick Green – guitar
 Foggy Lyttle – guitar
 Michael Fields – Spanish guitar, lute
 Martin Winning – tenor and baritone saxophones
 Matt Holland – trumpet
 Paddy Moloney – whistle
 Myles Drennan – piano, Hammond organ
 Brian Connor – piano, keyboards
 Dave Lewis – piano
 John Allair – Hammond organ
 Jerome Rimson – bass, backing vocals
 David Hayes – bass
 Liam Bradley – drums, backing vocals
 Noel Bridgeman, Johnathan Mele née Jonathan Mele, Bobby Irwin – drums
 Johnny Scott, Siobhan Pettit, Olwin Bell, Crawford Bell, Aine Whelan, Karen Hamill – backing vocals
 Irish Film Orchestra – strings

Production:
 Richard Evans – Design and art direction, sleeve photographs
 Tim Young at Metropolis Mastering, London – Mastering
 Javier Pierini/Getty Images  – Front cover photograph
 Solly Lipsitz – Sleeve notes

Charts 
Album – UK Album Chart

Album – Billboard

References 

Sources:
 Heylin, Clinton (2003). Can You Feel the Silence? Van Morrison: A New Biography, Chicago Review Press, 
 Rogan, Johnny (2006). Van Morrison: No Surrender, London:Vintage Books  
 Paste Magazine Review: Magic Time

External links 
 Rolling Stone Review #17
 Paste Magazine: Listening to Old Voices
 CD covers

Van Morrison albums
2005 albums
Geffen Records albums
Albums produced by Van Morrison